Soldatske is a village in Kherson Raion (district) in Kherson Oblast of southern Ukraine, at about  north-west from the centre of Kherson city. It belongs to Chornobaivka rural hromada, one of the hromadas of Ukraine.

The village came under attack by Russian forces in 2022, during the Russian invasion of Ukraine and was regained by Ukrainian forces by October the same year

References

Villages in Kherson Raion
Chornobaivka rural hromada